Valerii Yuriyovych Fedorchuk (born 5 October 1988) is a retired Ukrainian professional footballer who played as a midfielder.

Career
Fedorchuk was born in Netishyn, Khmelnytskyi Oblast, Ukrainian SSR, Soviet Union. He began his career in the youth side for Svitanok Vinnytsia under head coach Sergey Verich, who scored in his first season 25 goals in the Duflo 71 and in 2005 signed his first professional contract for FC Kryvbas Kryvyi Rih, here earned his first seven professional matches over two years.

In January 2007 Fedorchuk left Kryvbas Kryvyi Rih and signed for FC Lviv who played 29 games, two Cup Matches and scored three goals. On 1 March 2010, he joined Ukrainian Premier League side FC Dnipro Dnipropetrovsk for €480,000 transfer fee, but was initially loaned back to Kryvbas.

On 4 February 2016, Fedorchuk signed a contract with Ukrainian champions Dynamo Kyiv until the end of the 2015–16 season, signing as a free agent after his contract with Dnipro Dnipropetrovsk had expired.

On 21 August 2020, Fedorchuk signed a contract with Ukrainian club Rukh Lviv as a free agent after his contract with  Mariupol had expired.

Valerii announced the end of playing career on 13 March 2023 after 296 total appearances in Ukrainian Premier League.

International career
On 27 May 2008, he earned his first international match for the Ukraine national under-21 football team and presented the team between now in 12 matches and scored one goal.

Personal life
In June 2011, Fedorchuk married broadcaster Olena Kindzerska, daughter of FC Lviv's President Yuriy Kindzerskyi.

Honors
Dnipro Dnipropetrovsk
UEFA Europa League: runner-up 2014–15

Dynamo Kyiv
Ukrainian Premier League: 2015–16
Ukrainian Super Cup: 2016

References

External links
 
 
 Profile on Football Squads

1988 births
Living people
People from Netishyn
Ukrainian footballers
Ukraine under-21 international footballers
Ukrainian Premier League players
Ukrainian First League players
Latvian Higher League players
FC Podillya Khmelnytskyi players
FC Lviv players
FC Kryvbas Kryvyi Rih players
FC Dnipro players
FC Karpaty Lviv players
FC Volyn Lutsk players
FC Dynamo Kyiv players
NK Veres Rivne players
FC Mariupol players
FC Rukh Lviv players
Association football midfielders
Riga FC players
Ukrainian expatriate footballers
Expatriate footballers in Latvia
Ukrainian expatriate sportspeople in Latvia
Sportspeople from Khmelnytskyi Oblast